is a Japanese manga series by Koichi Endo which first appeared in Weekly Shōnen Jump in issues 49–50 in 1984, and then ran from 1985 (issue 14) through 1989 (issue 22). There are 18 volumes of the manga. The manga was adapted into a 43–episode anime series which was produced by NAS and Fuji Television and ran on Fuji TV from October 10, 1987 through October 1, 1988. Tonchinkan aired directly following High School! Kimengumi.

Anime
Cast
Leader / Nukesaku Aida: Yō Yoshimura
Red / Tonpū Chun (Zhong Dongfeng): Kaneto Shiozawa
Gurin / Chinpei Hatsuyama: Junichi Kanemaru
Shiron / Kanko Shirai: Noriko Hidaka
Police Chief: Hiroshi Ōtake
Akuzō Dokuoni: Takeshi Aono
Muyō Amachi: Yoku Shioya
Ibarakishi: Yusaku Yara
Andy Jones: Saeko Shimazu
Pon Honda: Naoko Matsui
Yatsu Akashi: Tomimichi Nishimura
Kyōko Yoshizawa: Yōko Kawanami
Shūzō Dokuoni: Naoki Tatsuta
Nanashi no Gonbee: Bin Shimada
Taika no Babaa: Kazuyo Aoki
Alien: Hiroshi Ōtake & Sukekiyo Kameyama
Nuke-chan Robo: Yō Yoshimura

Theme songs
Opening
Gomen ne Cowboy (Ushirogami Hikaretai)
Hora ne, Haru ga Kita (Ushirogami Hikaretai)
Mugiwara de Dance (Akiko Ikuina)

Ending
Möbius no Koibito (Ushirogami Hikaretai)
Dare mo Shiranai Blue Angel (Ushirogami Hikaretai)
Yume ni Aitai (Akiko Ikuina)

References

1987 anime television series debuts
Fuji TV original programming
Shueisha franchises
Shueisha manga
Shōnen manga